Pascula is a genus of sea snails, marine gastropod mollusks in the family Muricidae, the murex snails or rock snails.

Species
Species within the genus Pascula include:

 Pascula citrica (Dall, 1908)
 Pascula darrosensis (E.A. Smith, 1884)
 Pascula muricata (Reeve, 1846)
 Pascula ochrostoma (Blainville, 1832)
 Pascula ozenneana (Crosse, 1861)
 Pascula palmeri (Powell, 1967)
 Pascula philpoppei Houart, 2018
 Pascula rufonotata (Carpenter, 1864)
 Pascula submissa (E. A. Smith, 1903)
Species brought into synonymy
 Pascula ambonensis Houart, 1996: synonym of Cytharomorula ambonensis (Houart, 1996)
 Pascula ferruginosa Reeve, 1846: synonym of Claremontiella nodulosa (C. B. Adams, 1845)
 Pascula lefevreiana (Tapparone-Canefri, 1880): synonym of Cytharomorula lefevreiana (Tapparone-Canefri, 1880)

References

 Houart, R.: Zuccon, D. & Puillandre, N. (2019). Description of new genera and new species of Ergalataxinae (Gastropoda: Muricidae). Novapex. 20 (Hors série 12): 1-52.

External links
 Dall, W. H. (1908). Reports on the dredging operations off the west coast of Central America to the Galapagos, to the west coast of Mexico, and in the Gulf of California, in charge of Alexander Agassiz, carried on by the U.S. Fish Commission steamer "Albatross," during 1891, Lieut.-Commander Z.L. Tanner, U.S.N., commanding. XXXVII. Reports on the scientific results of the expedition to the eastern tropical Pacific, in charge of Alexander Agassiz, by the U.S. Fish Commission steamer "Albatross", from October, 1904 to March, 1905, Lieut.-Commander L.M. Garrett, U.S.N., commanding. XIV. The Mollusca and Brachiopoda. Bulletin of the Museum of Comparative Zoology. 43(6): 205-487, pls 1-22
 Radwin G. & D'Attilio A. (1972). The systematics of some New World muricid species (Mollusca, Gastropoda), with description of two new genera and two new species. Proceedings of the Biological Society of Washington. 85(28): 323-352

 
Ergalataxinae